Mariinskyi may refer to:

 Mariinskyi Palace, a neo-classical palace in Kyiv, Ukraine; ceremonial residence of the President of Ukraine
 Mariinskyi Park, a park located in Pechersk neighborhood, Kyiv

See also
 Mariinsky (disambiguation)